Karussell is a German rock band from Leipzig. The group was formed in 1976. The group is one of the well-known East German bands.

History
The group was founded in April 1976. Their first album Entweder oder was released in 1979. They have released 9 albums to date, with  loslassen being released in 2011. The group had a string of hits in East Germany in the 1980s, among them Wer die Rose ehrt, Ehrlich will ich bleiben, Autostop and especially Als ich fortging, which is often regarded as one of the most popular songs in the history of East Germany.

Discography
 1979: Entweder oder
 1980: Das einzige Leben
 1982: Schlaraffenberg
 1984: Was kann ich tun
 1987: Cafe Anonym
 1990: Solche wie du
 1994: Sonnenfeuer
 2002: Eigentlich geht's uns gut
 2011: loslassen

References

External links

 
 
 Karussell deutsche-mugge.de

German rock music groups